Timothy "Tim" Dwight Lewis is an American politician who served as a member of the New Mexico House of Representatives from January 18, 2011 to January 19, 2021.

Education
Lewis earned his MBA from Grand Canyon University.

Elections
2012: Lewis was unopposed for both the June 5, 2012 Republican Primary, winning with 1,133 votes and the November 6, 2012 General election, winning with 8,319 votes.
2010: To challenge District 60 incumbent Democratic Representative Jack Thomas, Tonia Harris was unopposed for the June 1, 2010 Republican Primary; after Harris withdrew, Lewis was placed on the November 2, 2010 General election ballot, and won with 6,980 votes (60.9%) against Representative Thomas.
 In 2020, Lewis announced that he would not be a candidate for reelection.

References

External links
Official page at the New Mexico Legislature
Campaign site

Timothy Lewis at Ballotpedia
Timothy Dwight Lewis at the National Institute on Money in State Politics

Place of birth missing (living people)
Year of birth missing (living people)
Living people
Schoolteachers from New Mexico
Grand Canyon University alumni
Republican Party members of the New Mexico House of Representatives
People from Rio Rancho, New Mexico
21st-century American politicians